Francisco Avitia Tapia (13 May 1915 – 29 June 1995), commonly known as "El Charro Avitia", was a Mexican singer, primarily of ranchera and corrido genres. His best known songs include "Maquina 501," "Caballo alazán lucero," and "El Muchacho Alegre". He also acted in films such as Primero soy mexicano (1950) and El zurdo (1965). 
Avitia was born in Pilar de Conchos (Valle de Zaragoza), Chihuahua, and at the age of six his family moved to Ciudad Juárez. He died from cardiac arrest in a Mexico City hospital at the age of 80.

Filmography
Primero soy mexicano (1950)
If I Were Just Anyone (1950)
 The Masked Tiger (1951)
La venganza del Diablo (1955)
Sed de amor (1959)
El zurdo (1965)
Variedades de media noche (1977)
Viva México (1977)

References

Ranchera singers
Mexican male film actors
People from Chihuahua (state)
1915 births
1995 deaths
20th-century Mexican male actors
20th-century Mexican male singers